An increasing process is a stochastic process 

 

where the random variables  which make up the process are increasing almost surely and adapted:

A continuous increasing process is such a process where the set  is continuous.

Stochastic processes